These are the results from the synchronised swimming competition at the 2005 World Aquatics Championships.

Medal table

Medal summary

 
2005 in synchronized swimming
Synchronised swimming
Synchronised swimming at the World Aquatics Championships